The Pembroke Hill School (usually referred to as Pembroke Hill) is a progressive, inclusive, secular, coeducational, independent preparatory school for about 1,200 students in early years (age 2 years) through high school, separated into four sections: early years-prekindergarten (early childhood school), kindergarten-5th grade (lower school), 6th-8th grade (middle school), and 9th-12th grade (upper school). It is located on two campuses in the Country Club District of Kansas City, Missouri, near the Country Club Plaza.

Vassie James Ward Hill, a prominent Kansas Citian and Vassar College graduate born in 1875, gained a considerable fortune upon the death of her first husband, Hugh Ward, a son of pioneer Seth E. Ward. She then married Albert Ross Hill, formerly president of the University of Missouri.

At the time, Kansas Citians of means commonly sent their children to boarding schools on the east coast. Hill did not want to send her daughter and three sons "back east." She believed they should be able to have an equal education in Kansas City. This led her to research the workings of college preparatory schools, especially the progressive education of the Country Day School movement.

In 1910, using funds from 12 Kansas City businessmen, Hill founded the Country Day School for boys, which accepted both day students and boarders (boarding ceased in the 1950s). The initial enrollment was 20 students but grew to 52 within three years. It sat on what is today Pembroke Hill's Ward Parkway Campus, to the west of the Country Club Plaza at the intersection of State Line Road.

Three years later, Ruth Carr Patton and Frances Matteson Bowersock joined with Hill to found the Sunset Hill School, named after Hill's favorite area on the Vassar campus. Sunset Hill was located on what today is Pembroke Hill's Wornall Campus, south of the Country Club Plaza. At the time of its founding, the campus overlooked the Kansas City Country Club (today Loose Park). It also includes a portion of the battlefield from the Battle of Westport.

In 1925, some educators and students left the Country Day School to form the Pembroke School for boys. Their endeavor failed amidst the Great Depression, and the two schools re-merged in 1933 to form the Pembroke-Country Day School, keeping the Country Day School's original campus. It usually was referred to as "Pem Day."

Merger 
From the start, Sunset Hill and Pembroke-Country Day worked cooperatively. Often, teachers taught at both schools. For generations, many Kansas City families would send their boys to Pem Day and their girls to Sunset Hill. School activities, such as plays and dances, often were combined, and Sunset Hill girls were cheerleaders for Pem Day's athletic teams. In 1963, the schools began coeducational classes in upper-level math, science, and languages.

In the early 1980s, the two schools began merger discussions, ultimately merging in 1984 to become the Pembroke Hill School. The class of 1985 elected to have separate graduation ceremonies. True coeducation began the next year. The former Sunset Hill campus became home to the primary and lower schools (then preschool through 6th grade), and the former Pem Day campus became home to the middle and upper schools (then 7th grade through 12th grade).

Recent events 
In 1988, Kansas City Magazine notoriously published an article titled "A High School on Easy Street", criticizing Pembroke Hill's students' allegedly "advantaged way of life."

In the late 1990s and early 2000s, Pembroke Hill completed a $50 million capital improvement project, which renovated both campuses. The Ward Parkway campus gained a new middle school building, Boocock Middle School (which now serves 6th-8th grades), a new upper school building, Jordan Hall, a new arts center, and a new library, the James M. Kemper, Sr. Library.

In June 2020, the school announced the beginning of their "Building Together" construction project on the Ward Parkway campus. The $52 million project is expected to be completed by the spring of 2022. The renovation will include changes to a number of areas on the Ward Parkway campus, including: 
 A renovated, single-level campus green
 A new dining hall 
 A new athletic center featuring a competition and auxiliary gym. New bleachers and a press box will back up to the athletic center.
 An updated Hall Student Center with a larger lobby space for the performing arts. 
 A new skywalk connecting the dining hall with the existing Centennial Hall.
 The removal of Pierson Gym, which will be turned into a green space on campus.

In 1997, 1998, and 1999, Pembroke Hill's boys' basketball team won the Missouri Class 2A state title. In 2000, however, in a nationally publicized scandal, the Missouri State High School Activities Association stripped Pembroke of the titles and placed the school on probation after the Kansas City Star revealed that promoter and AAU coach Myron Piggie had remitted cash payments to two of the school's star players, Kareem Rush and his brother JaRon Rush, to play on his "amateur" basketball team. Piggie admitted to paying JaRon Rush $17,000 and Kareem Rush $2,300, after which the brothers "submitted false and fraudulent Student Athlete Statements to the universities where they were to play intercollegiate basketball", certifying that they had not been paid to play basketball. As a result, the University of California, Los Angeles and the University of Missouri found themselves subject to NCAA penalties for awarding athletic scholarships to non-amateurs. On Piggie's 2002 appeal from his prison sentence and restitution for conspiracy to commit wire fraud, mail fraud, and tax evasion, the United States Court of Appeals for the Eighth Circuit found that Pembroke Hill had "sustained a loss of $10,733.89 in investigative costs and forfeiture of property as a result of" Piggie's conspiracy.

In the Class of 2013, 29 seniors were recognized by National Merit. Of these 29, 21 or 21% of the class, are National Merit Semifinalists.  Eight of the students are Commended Students.  This number represents the second highest percentage in Missouri.

On September 7, 2017, Dr. Steve Bellis announced that the 2018–2019 school year would be his last as Head of School. Dr. Bellis served as the Headmaster of the Ward Parkway Campus of The Pembroke Hill School for 16 years. Upon his departure, Pembroke welcomed in Brad Shelley as the newest Head of School. Shelley was previously serving as associate headmaster at the McDonogh School, in Baltimore, MD.

According to The Kansas City Star, students at Pembroke Hill have "faced several incidents of anti-Semitic behavior at Pembroke." On the 2021 International Holocaust Remembrance Day in January, a swastika was discovered on a student's desk. The symbol was accompanied by an offensive reference toward members of the school's LGBT community. The incident was covered by citywide media and contextualized by prior incidents where one student raised his arm in a Nazi salute while calling a Jewish student an offensive name, and swastikas were painted on a Jewish student's locker. Several Jewish parents spoke to The Star on the condition of anonymity, fearing reprisals against their children. Following the incident, officials initiated a hiring search for the newly created position of Director of Diversity, Equity, and Inclusion.

In April 2021, months after a swastika was discovered in a classroom, school officials found "KKK" written on the side of a desk. School officials hired consulting firm Sophic Solutions to "hold community conversations, complete a diversity and equity audit, and then present recommendations."

Tuition and financial aid 
Tuition and fees for the 2020–21 school year range from $15,385 for students up to pre-kindergarten to $25,745 for upper school. About 25 percent of students receive financial aid, totaling more than $3.7 million each year.

In May 2007, the Malone Family Foundation, established by John C. Malone of Denver, Colorado, gave a $2 million grant to Pembroke's endowment, the largest single endowment gift in the school's history. The gift was used to create the Malone Scholars Program to give need-based financial aid to highly qualified students who otherwise would qualify for at least 50 percent in financial aid.

Assets and contributions 
The school has assets of over $100 million and an endowment of more than $38 million. In 2013 the school successfully completed a $15,000,000 endowment campaign connected to its centennial.

Accreditation 
Pembroke Hill is accredited by the Independent Schools Association of the Central States (ISACS) and the National Association for the Education of Young Children. The school is a member of the National Association of Independent Schools (NAIS).

Athletics 
Pembroke Hill has a long athletic tradition. Its colors are blue and red, its teams are known as the Raiders, and its mascot resembles a Viking raider. Pembroke is a member of the Missouri State High School Activities Association.

Championships 
Today, the school is a perennial contender for or winner of Class 2 state championships in boys' lacrosse, golf, tennis, and soccer; and girls' golf and tennis.

In 2006 and 2007, the girls' basketball team won the Missouri Class 3 state title. The Raiders lacrosse team won the 2009 Division II state championship, beating Eureka High School 6-5 after trailing 5–2 in the 4th quarter. The boys' tennis team also won the 2009 Division II state championship, sweeping all teams up until the final, where Pembroke won 5–2. In 2017, the Raiders won state tennis tournaments in both the boys and girls class 1 sections. The boys defeated The Saint Louis Priory School 5–2 in the finals, while the girls upended the defending champion John Burroughs School 5–4 in October.

In 2021, boys' golf member Ryan Lee won the Missouri golf championships for the second time in his high school career. Lee set a state record for the lowest two day score, firing a total score of 133 (67,66).

Rivalries 
Pembroke Hill has cross-state athletic rivalries with two schools located in suburbs of St. Louis: MICDS and John Burroughs School, both in Ladue, Missouri. The Raiders' biggest rivals in the Kansas City area are fellow private schools in The Barstow School and Rockhurst High School.  Pembroke Hill also has a rivalry in football with St. Pius X located in the northland of Kansas City.

Sports offered 
For girls, Pembroke Hill offers:

For boys, Pembroke Hill offers:

In the past, Pembroke also has participated in softball, rugby union, and ice hockey. Additionally, the lower school campus has facilities for racquetball, and the upper school campus is one of only three locations in Kansas City, Missouri (along with the University of Missouri-Kansas City and the Kansas City Club) containing squash courts.

Academics 
The average Pembroke student takes classes that would be considered advanced in a different school. For example, the standard math curriculum in the middle and upper schools is as follow: pre-algebra in sixth grade, algebra 1 in seventh and eighth grade, geometry in ninth grade, algebra 2 in tenth grade, pre-calculus in eleventh grade, and calculus in twelfth grade.

Pembroke offers Advanced Placement (AP) courses in all academic disciplines, and approximately 90% of its graduates have taken at least one AP Course. 85% of Pembroke's AP scores are at a 3 or higher on a 5-point scale, and most colleges will give students credit for a score of 3 or higher.

Notable alumni and faculty

Government and politics
D. Brook Bartlett, class of 1955; District Judge, United States District Court for the Western District of Missouri (1981–2000), appointed by President Ronald Reagan
Richard L. Berkley, class of 1949; 52nd Mayor of Kansas City, Missouri (1979–91)
Bruce Forrester, class of 1928; judge, United States Tax Court (1957–78), appointed by President Dwight D. Eisenhower
John W. Lungstrum, class of 1963; District Judge, United States District Court for the District of Kansas (1991–), appointed by President George H. W. Bush
Karen McCarthy, English teacher, Sunset Hill School (1969–76); state representative, Missouri House of Representatives (1977–95); Missouri's 5th congressional district representative, United States House of Representatives (1995–2005)
Charles H. Price II, class of 1948; Ambassador of the United States to Belgium (1981–83) and to the United Kingdom (1983–89), appointed by President Ronald Reagan
Shombi Sharp, class of 1988; United Nations Resident Coordinator (Ambassador), Armenia (2018–present), appointed by UN Secretary-General António Guterres

Media and the arts
Richard Armstrong, class of 1967; Director of the Solomon R. Guggenheim Museum
Elizabeth Craft, class of 1989; writer for the television series Angel and The Shield; co-producer of The Shield
John Kander, class of 1944; Tony Award-winning and Academy Award-nominated Broadway theatre composer; musicals include Chicago, Cabaret, and Fosse; songs include Theme from New York, New York; films include Cabaret and Chicago
Frederick R. Koch, attended, billionaire collector and philanthropist
Matt Leisy, class of 1999; Broadway theatre and film actor
John Stewart Muller, class of 1995; motion picture and television commercial director, writer and producer; credits include Fling, Indiscretion. 
David Owen, class of 1973; author; staff writer for The New Yorker and contributing editor of Golf Digest
Gretchen Craft Rubin, class of 1984; author, The Happiness Project, Happier at Home and Better Than Before and hosts popular podcast "Happier With Gretchen Rubin."
Devo Springsteen (Devon Harris), class of 1995; Grammy Award-winning producer and songwriter
Whitney Terrell, class of 1986; author; credits include The Huntsman, named to the New York Times "notable" list in 2001
Aaron Rahsaan Thomas, class of 1995; Emmy Award-nominated producer and screenwriter; credits include episodes for Friday Night Lights, Numb3rs, and CSI: NY

Science and technology
Betty Eisner, class of 1933; pioneer in LSD research
Ralph Hoffmann, headmaster, Country Day School (1910–19); natural history teacher and amateur ornithologist and botanist; authored first true bird field guide
Ruth Patrick, class of 1925; botanist and limnologist at the University of Virginia specializing in diatoms and freshwater ecology
Kathryn Stephenson, class of 1930; first female American board-certified plastic surgeon

Education
Dean C. Allard, class of 1951; historian; director, United States Naval Historical Center (1989–95)
Ian Ayres, class of 1977; William K. Townsend Professor at the Yale Law School and professor at the Yale School of Management
Catherine Clinton, class of 1969; Professor of History at Queen's University Belfast
Joan Dillon, history teacher, Sunset Hill School (1962–71); historic preservation activist
Jay Lorsch, class of 1950; Louis Kirstein Professor of Human Relations at the Harvard Business School
Robert H. Mnookin, class of 1960; Samuel Williston Professor of Law at the Harvard Law School; law clerk to Supreme Court Justice John Marshall Harlan II (1969–70); father of law professor Jennifer Mnookin and uncle of writer Seth Mnookin
Franklin David Murphy, class of 1932; chancellor, University of Kansas (1951–60), University of California, Los Angeles (1960–68); chairman and CEO, Times Mirror Company (1968–80)

Business
Stanley Durwood, class of 1938; founder of AMC Theatres; invented the multiplex
Donald J. Hall, Sr., class of 1946; chairman, Hallmark Cards (1966–present); president and CEO, Hallmark Cards (1966–86); son of Hallmark Cards founder Joyce Hall
Donald J. Hall Jr., class of 1974; president and CEO, Hallmark Cards (2002-); son of Hallmark Cards chairman Donald J. Hall, Sr.
Irvine O. Hockaday Jr., class of 1954; president and CEO, Kansas City Southern Industries (1971–83), Hallmark Cards (1986–2001); member of the board, Hallmark Cards (1978–2001), Ford Motor Company (1987-), Dow Jones & Co. (1990–2007), Aquila, Inc. (1995–2001), Sprint (1995-), Crown Media Holdings (2000-), Estée Lauder (2001-); chairman, Federal Reserve Bank of Kansas City (1986)
John W. Jordan Jr., class of 1965; founder, The Jordan Company
Jen Kao, class of 1999; fashion designer; daughter of Garmin co-founder Min Kao

Sports
Masten Gregory, attended; Formula One driver
Bill Rockne, class of 1935, and Knute Rockne Jr., class of 1937; sons of Notre Dame football coach Knute Rockne, who was leaving Kansas City after visiting his sons at Pem-Day when he died in a plane crash
JaRon Rush, class of 1998; McDonald's All-American Team college basketball player, University of California-Los Angeles (1998–2000); professional ABA and NBA Development League player, brother of basketball players Kareem Rush and Brandon Rush
Kareem Rush, class of 1999; college basketball player, Missouri Tigers (1999–2002); professional NBA, NBA Development League, and ABA shooting guard, brother of basketball players JaRon Rush and Brandon Rush
Bill Wakefield, class of 1959; professional Major League Baseball pitcher, New York Mets (1964)
Tom Watson, class of 1967; professional golfer; won Masters Tournament (1977, 1981), the U.S. Open (1981), and the British Open (1975, 1977, 1980, 1982, 1983)
John Windsor, class of 1958; college basketball player, Stanford Indians (1959–63); professional NBA player, San Francisco Warriors (1963–64)
Nitin Dhiman, class of 1998, physician and  college basketball player, Iberoamerican University (1999-2005) and professional ABA player San Diego Wildcats (2006)
Kimberly Chexnayder, attended; on-air personality for NFL Media, (2018–present).
Clayton Custer, attended; former Loyola Chicago basketball standout and current Director of Video Operations and Player Development at the University of Oklahoma.
Marcus Smith, class of 2019; 3rd round selection by the Oakland Athletics in the 2019 MLB Draft, current member of the Texas Rangers organization.

References

External links 
 The Pembroke Hill School (Official Website)

Educational institutions established in 1910
High schools in Kansas City, Missouri
Schools in Kansas City, Missouri
Private high schools in Missouri
Private middle schools in Missouri
Private elementary schools in Missouri
1910 establishments in Missouri